Rogachikha is a rural locality (a village) in Verkhovazhskoye Rural Settlement, Verkhovazhsky District, Vologda Oblast, Russia. The population was 23 as of 2002. There are 2 streets.

Geography 
Rogachikha is located 6 km southwest of Verkhovazhye (the district's administrative centre) by road. Yuzhny is the nearest rural locality.

References 

Rural localities in Verkhovazhsky District